The 1970 New Hampshire gubernatorial election was held on November 3, 1970.

Incumbent Republican Governor Walter R. Peterson Jr. defeated Democratic nominee Roger J. Crowley with 45.99% of the vote.

Primary elections
Primary elections were held on September 8, 1970.

Democratic primary

Candidates
Roger J. Crowley, former State Commissioner of Resources and Economic Development
Dennis J. Sullivan, Mayor of Nashua
Charles F. Whittemore, former State Commissioner of Health and Welfare

Results

Republican primary

Candidates
Elmer E. Bussey, perennial candidate
Walter R. Peterson Jr., incumbent Governor
Meldrim Thomson Jr., publisher and unsuccessful candidate for Republican nomination for Governor in 1968

Results

General election

Candidates
Robert J. Crowley, Democratic
Walter R. Peterson Jr., Republican
Meldrim Thomson Jr., American. Having been defeated in the Republican primary, Thomson stood for George Wallace's American Party.

Results

References

Bibliography
 
 
 

1970
New Hampshire
Gubernatorial
November 1970 events in the United States